Naive or naïve indicates having or showing a lack of experience, understanding or sophistication.

Naive or naïve may also refer to:

Music
 Naïve Records, a French record label
 Naïve (album), 1990 album by KMFDM
 Naive, 2008 album by Micky & the Motorcars
 Naive, 1985 album by synthpop band Dalek I Love You
 "Naïve" (song), a 2006 song by The Kooks

Biology and medicine
 Drug-naïve, a patient who has not previously used a particular drug or someone who has not been exposed previously to an antigen
 Ecological naïvete, the habit of inexperienced animals not fearing predators
 Naive B cell, a type of T cell
 Naive T cell, a type of T cell
 Vaccine-naive

Mathematics and computer science
 Naïve algorithm, a very simple solution to a problem that has a very high time- or memory complexity
 Naive Bayes classifier, a simple probabilistic classifier
 Naive set theory, a non-axiomatic approach to set theory, in mathematics

See also

 
 Naïve art, art created by untrained artists, or artists aspiring to naïve realisations
 Naïve realism, a theory of perception thought to be representative of most people's understanding and method of interpretation of their perceptions
 Naïve. Super, a 1996 novel by the Norwegian Erlend Loe
 Naive John (born 1962), British artist and figurative painter
 Naïve empiricism, a term used in several ways in different fields
 Ingénue (disambiguation)